Fragaria orientalis is a diploid species of wild strawberry native to E. Asia – Eastern Siberia. It is occasionally cultivated as a novelty edible. It is written as 东方草莓 in Simplified Chinese and called (pinyin: dong fang cao mei) in Mandarin.

Key features 

Fragaria orientalis is a perennial, averaging 8 in (.2m) tall; it blooms from Apr to May.
It vigorously produces runners, like many herbaceous members of Fragariinae.

Distinguishing features 

 Fruit ripen purple-red with deeply inset ovoid achenes
 Hemispheric to obviate fruit
 Leaflets highly variable- 1–5 × 0.8–3.5 cm
 obovate or rhombic-ovate shape with slightly acute (pointed) tip
  abaxially pilose (fuzzy on the underside), especially near veins, slightly adaxial (near the stem/major midrib) pilose
 cuneate central leaflets, lateral (side) leaflets oblique (asymmetric)
  Flowers bisexual, rarely unisexual, 1–1.5 cm in diameter

Cultivation 
This plant is cultivated as an edible herb, although it is relatively rare in cultivation. Plants for a Future offers a preliminary method of cultivation.
Prefers a sunny position with moist, fertile soil for maximum production. However, plants can tolerate partial shade. Fragaria orientalis prefers a mulch of coniferous needles. They can be vigorous, spreading via runners. There is little invasive threat.

Distribution 
Fragaria orientalis is native to China and E Siberia, specifically the Chinese provinces of Gansu, Hebei, Heilongjiang, Jilin, Liaoning, Nei Mongol, Qinghai, Shaanxi, Shanxi, as well as in Korea, Mongolia, and E Russia. These plants can be found in forests and meadows on mountain slopes, usually  in the shade of forest trees at elevations of 600 – 4000 meters.

Numismatics 
Fragaria orientalis is depicted on the Mongolian  postage stamps of 1968 (face value is 30 Mongolian möngö)  and 1987 (face value is 1.20 Mongolian tögrög)

References 

orientalis
Berries
Plants described in 1926